Ciliopagurus vakovako is a species of hermit crab native to the Marquesas Islands. C. vakovako appears to be a vicariant of C. strigatus, a species widespread throughout the Indo-pacific region.

The species name vakovako is a Marquesan word meaning striped, which is an allusion to the transverse rings on the legs.

References

Hermit crabs
Crustaceans described in 2001